Charles Tabet, born July 1, 1987 in Michigan United States, is a professional basketball player currently playing in Lebanon for Sagesse Club in the Lebanese Basketball League. He was also represented the Lebanese National Basketball Team that participated in the 2011 FIBA Asia Championship in Wuhan in China, after being called to play as a replacement for retiree Jackson Vroman. Tabet started his college career at the University of South Alabama before deciding to sign his first professional contract for the Lebanese green castle Hekmeh BC along with twin brother Phillip. However, in 2014 Charles had signed for Al Mouttahed Tripoli along with former American Sacramento Kings center Hassan Whiteside to play in the 2014 Lebanese basketball season. And in 2017 he left Al Mouttahed Tripoli to sign for Al Riyadi Beirut.

References 
 http://basketball.asia-basket.com/player/Charles_Tabet/Al_Moutahed_Tripoli/115848?AmNotSure=1
 http://basketball.realgm.com/player/Charles-Tabet/Summary/20292
 https://web.archive.org/web/20170819100518/http://www.draftexpress.com/profile/Charles-Tabet-21310/stats/

External links 
 
 

1987 births
Living people
American expatriate basketball people in Lebanon
American men's basketball players
Basketball players from Michigan
Centers (basketball)
Lebanese men's basketball players
Sagesse SC basketball players
Al Riyadi Club Beirut basketball players